The Quantum3D Graphite arcade system was created by Quantum3D to succeed their Quicksilver and Quicksilver II boards. Like the Quicksilver II, the Graphite board has single side access to have all ports and drives accessible on a single side and is also based on standard PC hardware. The Graphite board is able to run Microsoft's Windows 98 or Windows 2000 Professional as an operating system.

Specifications
Basic Specifications
 OS: Microsoft Windows 98 or Windows 2000
 CPU: Intel Pentium III 733 MHz

 Graphic: Quantum3D Obsidian Voodoo 3
 Sound: 2.0 Integrated Audio (AC'97)
 Memory: 128 MB (SD-RAM)
 FSB: 133 MHz
 USB: 2 ports
 Video: 1 port (VGA)
 LAN: 1 port (10/100Mbit/s)
 Case Size: W 274 mm × D 197 mm × H 67 mm
 Power: 100–240 V AC
 Storage: HDD: 8GByte

Games
 Arctic Thunder (2001)

References

Arcade system boards
x86-based computers